Caledonian Road is a station on the Piccadilly line of the London Underground, between King's Cross St. Pancras and Holloway Road, and in Travelcard Zone 2. It was opened on 15 December 1906 by the Great Northern, Piccadilly and Brompton Railway.  The building was designed by Leslie Green.

Caledonian Road station is located on Caledonian Road in Holloway, north London. The station continues to use lifts, never having been upgraded to escalators. Unusually for stations of its era, the lifts descend directly to platform level with no secondary staircases. In recent times this has meant that the station is now advertised as "Step Free" on line maps without rebuilding work taking place. The station is a Grade II listed building.

The next northbound station from Caledonian Road is Holloway Road while the next southbound station was originally York Road. This station closed in 1932, but can still be seen from trains. York Road was planned to be open to relieve congestion at King's Cross St. Pancras.

Temporary closure
The station was scheduled to be closed from 4 January 2016 until mid-August 2016, to enable the two lifts to be upgraded.  A local campaign against the closure emerged via a Change.org petition and achieved close to 7,500 supporters.  The petitioners claimed that the station could be kept open while new lifts were installed in two unused lift shafts.  This was previously done when lifts were replaced in 1987 and the station remained open throughout.

In January 2016, Islington Council announced that it had applied for a Judicial Review of Transport for London's plan, to be heard on 25 February 2016. On 19 January 2016, Underground management announced that the closure plan had been shelved and that new arrangements would be made to keep the station open during lift refurbishment.

Service Pattern

The typical off-peak service from this station is as follows:
12 tph (trains per hour) to Heathrow Airport via Central London
6 of these to terminals 4 and 1,2,3
6 of these to terminals 1,2,3 and 5
3 tph to Rayners Lane via Central London
3 tph to Uxbridge via Central London and Rayners Lane
3 tph to Northfields via Central London
18 tph to Cockfosters
3 tph to Arnos Grove

Location

The station is close to Pentonville Prison and Caledonian Park, the site of the former Victorian Metropolitan Cattle Market, is a short distance away on Market Road.

Platform Level Tiling

The stations along the central part of the Piccadilly line, as well as some sections of the Northern line, were financed by Charles Yerkes, and are famous for the Leslie Green designed red station buildings and distinctive platform tiling. Each station has its own unique tile pattern and colours.

Connections
London Buses routes 17, 91 and 259 serve the station.
Caledonian Road and Barnsbury station on the North London Line is about half a mile to the south.

References 

Piccadilly line stations
London Underground Night Tube stations
Tube stations in the London Borough of Islington
Former Great Northern, Piccadilly and Brompton Railway stations
Railway stations in Great Britain opened in 1906
1906 establishments in England
Leslie Green railway stations